The following is a list of notable people associated with Mississippi State University, located in the American city of Starkville, Mississippi.

Notable alumni

Politics and government
 Sharion Aycock, first female federal district court judge in Mississippi
 Marsha Blackburn, U.S. Senator from Tennessee
 Randy Boyd, forester who serves as a Republican in the Mississippi House of Representatives for District 19 in his native Itawamba County 
 Jenifer Branning, Republican member of the Mississippi State Senate
 Videt Carmichael, Republican member of the Mississippi State Senate
 Cynthia Cooper, whistleblower, 2002 Time Person of the Year
 Leonard B. Cresswell, major general in the Marine Corps; World War II Navy Cross recipient
 Jess Dickinson, Mississippi Supreme Court Justice
 Charles D. Easley, Mississippi Supreme Court Justice
 Josh Harkins, Republican member of the Mississippi State Senate
 Horace Harned, former member of the Mississippi House of Representatives
 Bill Hawks, former USDA Undersecretary, Marketing and Regulatory Programs
 Mark Keenum, USDA Undersecretary, Farm and Foreign Agricultural Service
 Rhonda Keenum, Assistant to President George W. Bush and director of White House Public Liaison
 Billy McCoy, Speaker of the Mississippi House of Representatives
 Troy H. Middleton, World War II corps commander (lieutenant general) and president of Louisiana State University
 G.V. "Sonny" Montgomery, former U.S. Representative and author of the Montgomery G.I. Bill
 John C. Stennis, former U.S. Senator; "father of the Modern Navy"
 Amy Tuck, Mississippi Lieutenant Governor
 William Waller Jr., Mississippi Supreme Court Justice
 Albert H. Wilkening, Adjutant General of Wisconsin

Academia
 James E. Cofer, Fulbright Scholar and former president of Missouri State University in Springfield, Missouri, and former president of the University of Louisiana at Monroe
 Frances Lucas, vice president and campus executive officer of the University of Southern Mississippi-Gulf Coast
 Damir Novosel, Fulbright Scholar, founder and president of Quanta Technology in Raleigh, North Carolina, former vice president of ABB Automation Products, and former president of IEEE Power & Energy Society
 Malcolm Portera, former chancellor of the University of Alabama System 
 Priscilla Slade, former president of Texas Southern University

Business
 Richard Adkerson, CEO of Freeport-McMoRan Copper & Gold Inc.
 George W. Bryan, senior vice president of Sara Lee Corporation, CEO of Sara Lee Foods, and founder of Old Waverly Golf Club
 Toxey Haas, founder and CEO of Haas Outdoors, Inc. (Mossy Oak)
 Martin F. Jue, amateur radio inventor; entrepreneur; founder of MFJ Enterprises
 Hartley Peavey, founder of Peavey Electronics
 Dalton Pritchard, early color television systems pioneer at RCA Laboratories
 Arthur L. Williams, Jr., insurance magnate, #583 on Forbes list of the world's billionaires

Media and arts

 Kevin Benson, meteorologist for WPXI in Pittsburgh
 Turner Catledge, former vice president of The New York Times
 Jerry Clower, comedian
 Bill Evans, meteorologist for WABC-TV, ABC affiliate in New York City
 John Grisham, author of more than two dozen novels, many of which have been made into screenplays
 Matthew F. Jones, novelist
 Gregory Keyes, author
 Donna Ladd, journalist
 Sean McLaughlin, MSNBC Chief Meteorologist
 Lewis Nordan, author
 Audrey Puente, New York City meteorologist; daughter of salsa singer Tito Puente
 Frank K. Spain, founder of Tupelo television station WTVA; broadcasting pioneer
 Joe M. Turner, magician, mentalist, professional speaker
 Brad Watson (born 1955), author

Athletics

 Jim Ashmore, former NBA player
 Denico Autry, DE, Oakland Raiders
 Vick Ballard, NFL running back, Indianapolis Colts
 Johnthan Banks, cornerback for the Tampa Bay Buccaneers
 Korey Banks, CFL DB BC Lions
 Kevin Bouie, NFL player
 Timmy Bowers, professional basketball player, 2006 Israeli Basketball Premier League MVP
 Jimmy Bragan, former MLB coach with Cincinnati, Montreal, and Milwaukee 1967–1977
 Jeff Brantley, former Major League Baseball relief pitcher; commentator for the Cincinnati Reds
 Rickey Brown, C for Golden State, Atlanta Hawks
 Titus Brown, NFL defensive end, Cleveland Browns
 Shawn Byrdsong, football player
 Van Chancellor, former head coach of women's basketball at Louisiana State University, at the University of Mississippi, and of the Houston Comets of the WNBA
 Ed Chapman, P for the Washington Senators in 1933
 Bubba Church, pitcher for the Phillies, Reds, and Cubs from 1950 to 1955
 Will Clark, former first baseman for San Francisco Giants, Baltimore Orioles, St. Louis Cardinals, and Texas Rangers
 John Cohen, Mississippi State University Head Coach
 Keo Coleman, former NFL linebacker
 Michael Connell (golfer), PGA golfer 2001–2006
 Johnie Cooks, NFL linebacker, Super Bowl XXV Champion 
 Fletcher Cox, defensive tackle for the Philadelphia Eagles of the National Football League
 Hughie Critz, second baseman for Cincinnati Reds (1920s) and the New York Giants (1930s)
 Quinton Culberson, NFL linebacker, St. Louis Rams
 Erick Dampier former NBA player
 Charlie Davidson, football player
 Brandon Davis (fighter), professional Mixed Martial Artist competing in the UFC.
 Anthony Dixon, NFL running back,  San Francisco 49ers
 Art Davis (American football), NFL player, college football coach
 Harper Davis, NFL Player, college football head coach
 Kevin Dockery, NFL Super Bowl XLII Champion
 Dominic Douglas, NFL linebacker, Denver Broncos
Frank Dowsing, first black football player at MSU
 Eric Dubose, P for Baltimore and Cleveland from 2002 to 2006
 Sammy Ellis, former Major League Baseball pitcher, 7 seasons
 Bobby Etheridge, former MLB player
 Rags Faircloth, P for Phillies in 1919
 Dave "Boo" Ferriss, former Major League Baseball player
 Ronald Fields, NFL DT, Denver Broncos
 Steve Freeman, former Buffalo Bills defensive back for 13 seasons; NFL game official
 Joe Fortunato, five-time Pro Bowler with the Chicago Bears
 Chuck Gelatka, NFL player
 Matt Ginter, pitcher for the Houston Astros
 De'Mon Glanton, football player
 Tom Goode, former NFL center and Super Bowl veteran
 Alex Grammas, former Major League infielder
 Hoyle Granger, former NFL running back
 Paul Gregory, pitcher in Major League Baseball, played 1932–1933 for the Chicago White Sox
 Justin Griffith, NFL running back, Oakland Raiders
 Michael Haddix, former NFL running back
 Mario Haggan, NFL linebacker, Denver Broncos
 Tang Hamilton, Miami Heat
 Walt Harris, NFL cornerback, San Francisco 49ers
 Bunny Hearn, former MLB player; college coach
 Ron Hill, vice president of the NFL
 John Hilliard, NFL player
 Jim Howarth, Major League Baseball outfielder; played all or part of four seasons in the majors, 1971–1974, for the San Francisco Giants
 Bailey Howell, NBA Hall of Famer
 Kent Hull, former NFL C, Buffalo Bills
 Kirby Jackson, NFL DB Buffalo Bills
 Justin Jenkins, NFL wide receiver, Buffalo Bills
 Morley Jennings, former head football coach of the Baylor Bears; former Athletic Director of the Texas Tech Red Raiders
 Alan Johnson, Colorado Rockies
 Chris Jones, American player of Canadian football
 Dontae' Jones, Celtics
 James Jones, NFL running back, Dallas Cowboys
 Todd Jordan, American football player
 Tommy Kelly, NFL defensive end, Oakland Raiders
 Tyrone Keys, NFL linebacker, Super Bowl XX Champion
 Jon Knott, former Major League Baseball outfielder with the Padres and Orioles
 Jack Lazorko, pitcher for the Milwaukee Brewers, Seattle Mariners, Detroit Tigers and California Angels
 Donald Lee, NFL tight end, Green Bay Packers; Super Bowl XLV Champion
 D. D. Lewis, former All-Star linebacker Dallas Cowboys; member of the College Football Hall of Fame
 Carlton Loewer, retired Major League Baseball player 
 Lance Long, NFL wide receiver, Arizona Cardinals 
 Jim Lyle, pitcher for the Washington Senators (now the Minnesota Twins) in 1925
 Paul Maholm, LHP Atlanta Braves; formerly with Pittsburgh Pirates, Chicago Cubs
 Jeff Malone, two-time All-Star as a player; coached three teams in NBA D-League
 Chris Maloney, Memphis Redbirds Manager (St. Louis Cardinals AAA)
 James H. "Babe" McCarthy, college and professional basketball coach
 Fred McCrary, NFL running back
 Alvin McKinley, NFL  defensive end, Denver Broncos
 Bo McKinnis, sports agent
 Pernell McPhee, linebacker, Chicago Bears; formerly with Baltimore Ravens
 Brandon McRae, NFL wide receiver, St. Louis Rams
 Brandon Medders, MLB player
 John Miller, NFL linebacker, Green Bay Packers
 Leland Mitchell, New Orleans Buccaneers of the ABA
 Monroe Mitchell, Washington Senators
 Willie Mitchell, Cleveland Naps/Indians and Detroit Tigers
 Henry Monroe, NFL DB Green Bay Packers
 Mitch Moreland, first baseman, Boston Red Sox
 Eric Moulds, NFL wide receiver, Buffalo Bills
 Arnett Moultrie, Philadelphia 76ers
 Buddy Myer, Major League Baseball, two-time All-Star second baseman
 Bob Myrick, LHP for the New York Mets
 Tom Neville, former NFL offensive tackle, 14 seasons
Malik Newman (born 1997), basketball player in the Israeli Basketball Premier League
 Jerious Norwood, NFL running back for the Atlanta Falcons
Romero Osby (born 1990), American basketball player for Maccabi Kiryat Gat of the Israeli Basketball Premier League
 Walter Packer, NFL player
 Rafael Palmeiro, former Major League Baseball player
 Jonathan Papelbon, RHP Boston Red Sox and Philadelphia Phillies; All-Star in 2006, 2007, 2008, and 2009
 Jackie Parker, former All-Star quarterback CFL; member of the College Football Hall of Fame
 Wiley Peck, Spurs, Mavericks
 Adam Piatt, played for the Oakland Athletics and Tampa Bay Devil Rays
 Jay Powell, former Major League Baseball relief pitcher, 11 seasons; World Series veteran
 Dak Prescott, NFL quarterback, Dallas Cowboys
 Gary Rath, Dodgers, Twins
 Fred Reid, CFL running back, Winnipeg Blue Bombers
 Lawrence Roberts, Memphis Grizzlies
 Ray Roberts, played for the Philadelphia Athletics
 DelJuan Robinson, NFL defensive tackle, Houston Texans
 Jon Shave, former player for the Texas Rangers and the Minnesota Twins
 Buck Showalter, former baseball manager
 Renardo Sidney, former NBA player
 Jeffery Simmons, NFL defensive tackle, Tennessee Titans
 Barrin Simpson, NFL linebacker
 Deontae Skinner, NFL player
 Darius Slay, cornerback for the Detroit Lions
 Don Smith, quarterback/running back for Buccaneers, Bills, and Dolphins
 Truett Smith, football player
 Fred Smoot, former NFL cornerback
 Homer Spragins, former MLB player
 David Stewart, NFL OT Tennessee Titans
 Scott Stricklin, former athletic director for Mississippi State Bulldogs, athletic director for Florida Gators 
 Walter Suggs, former All-Star lineman for Houston Oilers
 Montez Sweat, NFL linebacker, Washington Redskins
 Craig Tatum, former MLB player
 Ken Tatum, former MLB player
 Bobby Thigpen, former Major League Baseball relief pitcher
 Del Unser, former Major League Baseball outfielder
 Jarvis Varnado, Miami Heat
 Victoria Vivians, WNBA Guard Indiana Fever
 Fred Walters, catcher for the Boston Red Sox in 1945
 Kendell Watkins, NFL tight end, Dallas Cowboys
 Quinndary Weatherspoon, NBA shooting guard, Golden State Warriors
 Jimmy Webb, former NFL defensive lineman, 7 seasons
 Floyd Womack, NFL OT Seattle Seahawks
 Sid Womack, former MLB player
 Marc Woodard, NFL linebacker, Philadelphia Eagles
 Ellis Wyms, NFL LT, Super Bowl Champion with the Buccaneers, Oakland Raiders
Chris Young, pitching coach for the Philadelphia Phillies of Major League Baseball
 Pete Young, former MLB player
 Derrick Zimmerman, New Jersey Nets

Other
 Machine Gun Kelly, notorious criminal; studied agriculture at MSU for two years 
 Jaelyn Young and Muhammad "Moe" Dakhlalla, pleaded guilty to offenses related to their attempts to join ISIS in Syria

Notable faculty
 Anthony Sean Neal, author and philosophy professor at MSU
 Horace M. Trent, noted physicist who taught at MSU in the 1930s

References

Mississippi State University alumni